

History 
The Shrine Bowl Provincial Championships gave way to the American style of ranking schools. Schools are divided into three classes by total enrollment in grades 9-11 only: A (0-337 students), AA (340-618 students), and AAA (619 students and up). The championships then became known as Frank Gnup AAA Provincial Championships and the Gary Scott AA Provincial Championships.

The championships are a part of the Subway Bowl held at BC Place Stadium, in the province of British Columbia, and televised across Canada.

Gary Scott AA Provincial Champions

References
 (2005) Subway Bowl program, p. 25

External links
"Vasity Champions of the Past" 

High school football in Canada
Canadian football competitions
Canadian football in British Columbia